Which is the Man? is a 1782 comedy play by the British writer Hannah Cowley.

The original Covent Garden cast included John Henderson as Fitzherbert, William Thomas Lewis as Beauchamp, Richard Wroughton as Belville, John Quick as Pendragon, Charles Lee Lewes as Lord Sparkle, Isabella Mattocks as Sophy Pendragon, Sarah Maria Wilson as Kitty, Elizabeth Satchell as Julia and Elizabeth Younge as Bloomer.

References

Bibliography
 Nicoll, Allardyce. A History of English Drama 1660–1900: Volume III. Cambridge University Press, 2009.
 Hogan, C.B (ed.) The London Stage, 1660–1800: Volume V. Southern Illinois University Press, 1968.

1782 plays
Comedy plays
West End plays
Plays by Hannah Cowley